Jeanette, Jeannette or Jeanetta may refer to:

 Jeanette (given name), a given name (including a list of people and fictional characters with the name)

Places 
 Jeannette, Ontario, Canada
 Jeannette Island, Russia
 Jeannette, Pennsylvania, U.S.
 Jeannette Monument, United States Naval Academy Cemetery, Annapolis, Maryland, U.S.
 Jeanette State Forest, Minnesota, U.S.

People
 Jeanette (Spanish singer) (born 1951), Spanish singer
 Jeanette Biedermann, a German singer known mononymously by "Jeanette"
 Buddy Jeannette (1917–1998), basketball player and coach
 Daniel Jeannette (born 1961), director of animation and FX
 Gertrude Jeannette (1914-2018), actress
 Gunnar Jeannette (born 1982), racecar driver
 Joe Jeanette (1879–1958), heavyweight boxer
 Stanick Jeannette (born 1977), figure skater
 Jeanette Aw (born 1979), Singaporean actress

Other uses
 Jeannette: The Childhood of Joan of Arc, 2017 French film
 Jeannette (comics), a DC Comics character
 USS Jeannette (1878), Arctic exploration vessel, converted warship
 USS Jeannette (SP-149), a USN patrol craft in WWI
 "Jeanette", a song by the Beat from Special Beat Service
 "Jeanette", a song by Kelly Lee Owens from her album Inner Song.

See also
 Madame Jeanette, chili pepper cultivar
 Olive Jeanette, a 24-foot launch built in 1926